So Hot Productions is a music production company located in St. Louis, Missouri.

Awards and nominations
The following albums feature production by So Hot Productions.

Stellar Awards
2006, The Incredible Walk (nominated)
2006, The Thesis (nominated)
2007, Real Talk (nominated)
2007, The Faith (won)
2008, HIStory: Our Place In His Story (nominated)
Grammy Awards
2006, Higher Definition (nominated)
2008, HIStory: Our Place In His Story (nominated)
2008, Open Book (nominated)

Partial discography

2004
"Gift Rap" - The Cross Movement & Friends
"Higher Definition" - The Cross Movement

2005
"116 Clique: The Compilation Album" - 116 Clique
"The Faith" - Da' T.R.U.T.H.
"The Incredible Walk" - Phanatik
"The Journal, Vol. 1" - T.R.U.-L.I.F.E.
"Metamorphosis" - J.R.
"Rewind" - FLAME
"The Thesis" - The Ambassador

2006
"After the Music Stops" - Lecrae
"Kingdom People" - Tedashii
"If They Only Knew" - Trip Lee
"Chronicles (Greatest Hits, Vol. 1)" - The Cross Movement
"WhyHipHop? 2K6" - Various Artists

2007
"Everyday Process: The Process of Illumination & Elimination" - Everyday Process
"Our World: Fallen" - FLAME
"13 Letters" - 116 Clique
"HIStory: Our Place In His Story" - The Cross Movement
"Open Book" - Da’ T.R.U.T.H.
"Turn My Life Up" - Sho Baraka
"Life by Stereo" - J.R.

2008
"Our World: Redeemed" - FLAME
"Chronicles of an X-Hustler" - Thi'sl
"Life On Life" - Json
"20/20" - Trip Lee
"Rebel" - Lecrae
"SoapBox" - R-Swift
"The Chop Chop" - The Ambassador

2009
"A Different World" - Rio a.k.a. KuntryBoyy

"Focus EP" - Jai

2010
"Between Two Worlds" - Trip Lee
"Rehab" - Lecrae

2011
"The Whole Truth" - Da' T.R.U.T.H.
"Culture Shock" - Jai
"Murray's Grammar: New Rules" - J.R.

2012
"Gravity" - Lecrae
"High Society Collective" - High Society Collective (Courtney Orlando, Sho Baraka, Swoope, Natalie Lauren)

2013
"ATLast" - Alex Faith

2015
"Bloodlines" - Alex Faith

Record production teams